The San Francisco Demons (originally named San Jose Demons) were a short-lived springtime American football team based in San Francisco, California. This team was part of the failed XFL begun by Vince McMahon of World Wrestling Entertainment and by NBC, a major television network in the United States. Originally they were to be based in San Jose but prior to the start of the season they were moved to San Francisco. They were in the Western Division with the Los Angeles Xtreme, Las Vegas Outlaws and Memphis Maniax.

The team played in Pacific Bell Park in San Francisco; despite having the smallest stadium in the league, they also had the highest average attendance (34,954). The fans had a cheering section nicknamed "The Hellhole".

The team was coached by Jim Skipper, former running backs coach for the New York Giants.

History
In their only season of existence, the Demons went 5-5 to capture 2nd place in the regular season and qualified for post season play. In the first round, the Demons defeated the Orlando Rage, who had the best regular season record (8-2), by a score of 26-25. In the XFL's Million Dollar Game, which was the league championship game and last game in its history, the Demons were defeated by the Los Angeles Xtreme 38-6.

NBC dropped the XFL after the first season (2001) due to dismal ratings, and the league folded soon afterwards. The Demons played their home games in what was then Pacific Bell Park, now Oracle Park, the home of Major League Baseball's San Francisco Giants.

The most notable Demons players were Mike Pawlawski and Pat Barnes. Both played quarterback for the Demons in 2001. Pawlawski and Barnes both played for the California Golden Bears. Pawlawski was signed by the Demons after playing Arena Football for the Albany Firebirds. Barnes had been invited to training camp by the Oakland Raiders.

Season

|-
|2001 || 5 || 5 || 0 || 2nd Western || Won Semifinals (Orlando)Lost Million Dollar Game (Los Angeles)
|-
!Totals || 6 || 6 || 0
|colspan="2"| (including playoffs)

Schedule

Regular season

Post-season

Personnel

Staff

Standings

San Francisco Demons players

21 Wendell Davis CB college (Oklahoma) Davis played with the Dallas Cowboys for a little over three seasons. Davis played with Dallas for two full seasons (1996–97) before being sidelined for the 1998 season and part of 1999 season with the Cowboys.
18 Pat Barnes QB college (California) Barnes played two seasons in NFL Europe with the Frankfurt Galaxy. Barnes led the Galaxy to a World Bowl championship in 1999 and also saw a career highlight of 30 TD passes in his two years in NFL Europe. Barnes saw playing time in 1999 with the San Francisco 49ers. Barnes also pre-season action with the Kansas City Chiefs and later the Cleveland Browns after the XFL folded. Barnes was the Demons' second-string quarterback and saw spot duty through the season.
99 Eric England DE college (Texas A&M) England played three seasons in the NFL with the Arizona Cardinals (1994–1996) before embarking on a career in the CFL with the BC Lions in 1997–2000. In 2000 England was part of the Grey Cup champion BC Lions
84 Brian Roche TE college (San Jose State) Roche played nearly four season in the NFL. Roche played two years in San Diego with the Chargers 1996–97 before joining the Kansas City Chiefs for a season (1998) and a part of another (1999)
26 Juan Johnson RB college (Utah) Johnson played in the CFL with the BC Lions in 1999 and in five games with the NFL Europe's Amsterdam Admirals in 2000 before joining the XFL
89 Brian Roberson WR college (Fresno State) Roberson played in the Indoor Football League in 2000 with the Fargo Freeze before joining the XFL
Mike Pawlawski QB; Pawlawski, the longtime starting quarterback for the Arena Football League's Albany Firebirds, was the Demons' starting quarterback through the whole season. This would be Pawlawski's last time playing professional football; he retired from playing after the season and moved into broadcasting,

Team leaders
 Rushing yards: 228, Kelvin Anderson
 Receiving yards: 390, Jimmy Cunningham
 Passing yards: 1484, Mike Pawlawski
Final team regular season stats available at all-XFL

References

 
XFL (2001) teams
Defunct American football teams in California
American football teams in San Francisco
2001 establishments in California
2001 disestablishments in California